David Nathaniel Friedrich Dietrich (3 October 1800 – 23 December 1888) was German botanist and gardener.

Dietrich's birth year is listed as 1799 and 1800. He was born in Ziegenhain. In 1828 Dietrich worked as a botanical gardener in Jena. In 1836 he received his doctorate at the University of Jena, and later served as a curator at the botanical garden in Jena.

He was the nephew of the botanist Friedrich Gottlieb Dietrich (1765-1850).

Dietrich wrote pamphlets on poisonous plants, mosses, and forest flora and fauna of Germany as well as several botanical encyclopedias. His five-volume, 1839-1852 Synopsis Plantarum included about 80,000 species and 524 genera. The five-volume Flora of Germany published from 1833 to 1864 contains 1150 colored panels. The two-volume Forst Flora and the 476 booklets of the comprehensive Flora Universalis are his most famous work.

Works 
 Musci Thuringici, with Jonathan Carl Zenker, (1821-1823)
 Forst Flora, (two volumes 1828–1833)
 Flora Universalis, (476 booklets, 1828–1861)
 Flora Medica, (1831–1835)
 Lichenographia Germanica, (1832–1837)
 Deutschlands Flora, (5 volumes, 1833-1864)
 Synopsis Plantarum, (5 volumes, 1839-1852)
 Deutschlands ökonomische Flora, (1841–1844)

References

External links 

19th-century German botanists
1799 births
1888 deaths
University of Jena alumni
German horticulturists
People from Altenkirchen (district)